Killimordaly GAA is a hurling club located in the village of Killimordaly in east County Galway. The club was founded in 1912.

Honours
 Galway Senior Hurling Championship (1): 1986
 Connacht Senior Club Hurling Championship (1): 1986
 Connacht Intermediate Club Hurling Championship: (2) 2007, 2013

Notable players
 Brian Concannon
 Tom Donoghue
 Tony Keady
 John Ryan
 Éanna Ryan 
• Dermot Ryan
 Iggy Daly
Evan daly
 Brian (Barney) Cooney
 Paul (Teddy) Cooney
 Noel Cooney
 Dermot Cooney

External links
Official site

Gaelic games clubs in County Galway
Gaelic football clubs in County Galway